Mundi  is a village in Kapurthala district of Punjab State, India. The village is administrated by a Sarpanch, who is an elected representative.

Demography 
According to the report published by Census India in 2011, Mundi has total number of 261 houses and population of 1,377 of which include 707 males and 670 females. Literacy rate of Mundi is 59.29%, lower than state average of 75.84%.  The population of children under the age of 6 years is 188 which is 13.65% of total population of Mundi, and child sex ratio is approximately 790, lower than state average of 846.

Population data

Air travel connectivity 
The closest airport to the village is Sri Guru Ram Dass Jee International Airport.

Villages in Kapurthala

References

External links
  Villages in Kapurthala
 Kapurthala Villages List

Villages in Kapurthala district